Grabče is a settlement next to Zgornje Gorje in the Municipality of Gorje in the Upper Carniola region of Slovenia.

References

External links 
Grabče on Geopedia

Populated places in the Municipality of Gorje